Rafaela Aerodrome  is an airport serving Rafaela, a city in the Santa Fe Province of Argentina. The airport is on the south side of the city.

It features a small passenger terminal, due to be rebuilt or upgraded, and three runways. Daily traffic consists of one or two small commercial flights.

It is one of the few airports in Argentina that comprises two parallel runways.

See also

Transport in Argentina
List of airports in Argentina

References

External links
OpenStreetMap - Rafaela
OurAirports - Rafaela Airport

Airports in Argentina